The Paik or Paika (Odia:ପାଇକ) is a Militia community, found in Odisha state of India.

Origin
The Odia word Paika or Paiko, derived from Padatika, means foot Soldier. They were originally a class of military retainers had been recruited since the 16th century by kings in Odisha from a variety of social groups to render martial services in return for hereditary rent-free land (nish-kar jagirs) and titles. In the past the Paiks were recruited from various castes of which Khandayat were majority.  Later after the Caste based consensus introduced by Britishers, they were known as a caste.

History
The Paikas (Paikos) were started an armed rebellion ( Paika Rebellion or Paika Bidroha ) against the British East India Companys rule in Odisha in 1817.

Classification
The Paikos are included under Other Backward Class list in the state of Odisha.

References

External links
http://www.bcmbcmw.tn.gov.in/obc/faq/orrisa.pdf

Social groups of Odisha